Hugo Kortschak (28 February 1884 – 19 September 1957) was an Austrian-born American violinist and a member of the Chicago Symphony Orchestra from 1907 until 1914 (serving as assistant concertmaster from 1910 until 1914), founding member of the Berkshire String Quartet and Dean of Music at Yale University. His son was the plant physiologist Hugo P. Kortschak.

The Berkshire String Quartet was founded when music patroness Elizabeth Sprague Coolidge persuaded Kortschak to move his quartet from Chicago to Pittsfield, Massachusetts, where its members could focus exclusively on chamber music. In his youth Kortschak was a member of the Pozniak-Trio founded by the Polish Pianist Bronislaw Pozniak (de).
Kortschak was an owner of several fine violins, including:

 In 1914: a Joseph Guarnerius violin, once the property of the Crown Treasurer of Spain; and
 Period of ownership unknown:  Giuseppe Guarneri del Gesù, 1739c
 From 1925 to 1957: a 1698 Stradivarius violin, once owned by Joseph Joachim and later Joan Field

Kortschak was an influential teacher in Chicago, Illinois. Ruth Scott Miller, the first female music critic of the Chicago Tribune, studied violin with Kortschak between 1912 and 1915, first in Chicago and then Berlin. She credited Kortschak and conductor Frederick Stock for inspiring her to become a concert violinist. 

Kortschak was a key figure in organizing the Berkshire Chamber Music Festival founded by Coolidge. The original Berkshire String Quartet disbanded sometime after 1941.

Honors 
Kortschak is a recipient of the Elizabeth Sprague Coolidge Medal for "eminent services to chamber music."

References

External links 

1884 births
1957 deaths
American classical violinists
Male classical violinists
American male violinists
Yale University faculty
Concertmasters
Musicians from Chicago
Austro-Hungarian emigrants to the United States
Classical musicians from Illinois
20th-century classical violinists
20th-century American male musicians
20th-century American violinists